The Shriner's Daughter is a 1913 American silent short film starring Charlotte Burton, Violet Neitz, Helen Armstrong , William Bertram, Edith Borella, Ed Coxen, Reaves Eason, George Field, Winifred Greenwood, Ida Lewis, Nina Richdale and William Tedmarsh.

External links

1913 films
American silent short films
American black-and-white films
1910s American films